Country Boy is Bobby Vinton's fourteenth studio album, released in 1966. This album contains country songs, most of which were hits for different country music artists. All of the songs were recorded in Nashville. Cover versions include "Detour", "Riders in the Sky", "Crazy" and "Once a Day". There were no singles released from this album.

Track listing

Personnel
Bob Morgan – producer
Billy Sherrill – producer

References

1966 albums
Bobby Vinton albums
Epic Records albums
Albums produced by Billy Sherrill